The Linnan Campaign was one of the battles of the Eighth Route Army in the Second Sino-Japanese War.
As the Weinan Campaign was concluding, the 129th Division of the Eighth Route Army followed up the victory by launching the Linnan Campaign with part of the  strength of the Taihang Military Area Command and the South Hebei Military Command. In this campaign, they annihilated the main force of the 24th Group Army of the Peacebuilding National Army of the Wang Jingwei Government, led by Pang Bingxun and Sun Dianying, which were entrenched in the southern Taihang Mountain area to the west of the Beiping-Hankou Railway. 

The Linnan Campaign started at 0:30 am on August 18, 1943, and by 12:00 am the following day, all the puppet troops in the city were wiped out while the Japanese troops were besieged at Toudaoying. Starting from August 20, the Eighth Route Army exploited the military victory to press on, and recovered Dongyaoji, Lijiachang, Hebiji, Hejian, Yuankang and other places. Afterwards, it repulsed the attack by over 1,400 Japanese reinforcing troops at Anyang and Huixian. 

In the Linnan Campaign, the Eighth Route Army claimed it annihilated over 7,000 Japanese and puppet troops, shot down one Japanese aircraft and captured some 80 enemy strongholds while the Eighth Route Army took 790 casualties.

References
 The Weinan and Linnan Campaigns

Battles of the Second Sino-Japanese War
Conflicts in 1943
1943 in China
1943 in Japan
August 1943 events